Otruba is a rural locality (a khutor) in Mikhaylovka Urban Okrug, Volgograd Oblast, Russia. The population was 255 as of 2010. There are 9 streets.

Geography 
Otruba is located 16 km southwest of Mikhaylovka. Zapolosny is the nearest rural locality.

References 

Rural localities in Mikhaylovka urban okrug